St. Joseph's Miners' Hospital opened on August 27, 1887, in Ouray, Colorado.  The architectural style of the building is Italianate and it is constructed of native stone.  The hospital closed in 1964.  This structure has been placed on the United States National Register of Historic Places.

Ouray County Historical Museum
Today, this building houses the Ouray County Historical Society and operates as the Ouray County Historical Museum.  Exhibits include mining, ranching and railroad artifacts, minerals, Native American artifacts, period room displays, medical equipment, household items and cultural displays.  The museum also features a library and research center.

References

External links
Ouray County Historical Museum

Hospital buildings completed in 1887
Hospitals established in 1887
Hospital buildings on the National Register of Historic Places in Colorado
Buildings and structures in Ouray County, Colorado
Museums in Ouray County, Colorado
History museums in Colorado
Historic district contributing properties in Colorado
National Register of Historic Places in Ouray County, Colorado
1887 establishments in Colorado